Acacia Park may refer to:

 Acacia Park, Cape Town, South Africa
 Acacia Park Cemetery, Norwood Park Township, Illinois
 Acacia Park Cemetery, Mendota Heights, Minnesota